Rhabdochaeta obsoleta is a species of tephritid or fruit flies in the genus Rhabdochaeta of the family Tephritidae.

Distribution
Ethiopia.

References

Tephritinae
Insects described in 1924
Taxa named by Mario Bezzi
Diptera of Africa